St. Louis Madison Kennel was a U.S. soccer team established in 1928 in St. Louis, Missouri.  The team played in the St. Louis Soccer League for two seasons.  Madison Kennel reached the final of the 1929 National Challenge Cup where they lost 5-0 on aggregate to New York Hakoah in a two-game, home and away series.

Record

References

Defunct soccer clubs in Missouri
Madison Kennel
Madison Kennel
1928 establishments in Missouri
Association football clubs established in 1928